The Stability and Growth Pact (SGP) is an agreement, among all of the 27 member states of the European Union, to facilitate and maintain the stability of the Economic and Monetary Union (EMU). Based primarily on Articles 121 and 126 of the Treaty on the Functioning of the European Union, it consists of fiscal monitoring of members by the European Commission and the Council of the European Union, and the issuing of a yearly recommendation for policy actions to ensure a full compliance with the SGP also in the medium-term. If a Member State breaches the SGP's outlined maximum limit for government deficit and debt, the surveillance and request for corrective action will intensify through the declaration of an Excessive Deficit Procedure (EDP); and if these corrective actions continue to remain absent after multiple warnings, the Member State can ultimately be issued economic sanctions. The pact was outlined by a resolution and two council regulations in July 1997. The first regulation "on the strengthening of the surveillance of budgetary positions and the surveillance and coordination of economic policies", known as the "preventive arm", entered into force 1 July 1998. The second regulation "on speeding up and clarifying the implementation of the excessive deficit procedure", known as the "dissuasive arm", entered into force 1 January 1999.

The purpose of the pact was to ensure that fiscal discipline would be maintained and enforced in the EMU. All EU member states are automatically members of both the EMU and the SGP, as this is defined by paragraphs in the EU Treaty itself. The fiscal discipline is ensured by the SGP by requiring each Member State, to implement a fiscal policy aiming for the country to stay within the limits on government deficit (3% of GDP) and debt (60% of GDP); and in case of having a debt level above 60% it should each year decline with a satisfactory pace towards a level below. As outlined by the "preventive arm" regulation, all EU member states are each year obliged to submit a SGP compliance report for the scrutiny and evaluation of the European Commission and the Council of the European Union, that will present the country's expected fiscal development for the current and subsequent three years. These reports are called "stability programmes" for eurozone Member States and "convergence programmes" for non-eurozone Member States, but despite having different titles they are identical in regards of the content. After the reform of the SGP in 2005, these programmes have also included the Medium-Term budgetary Objectives (MTO's), being individually calculated for each Member State as the medium-term sustainable average-limit for the country's structural deficit, and the Member State is also obliged to outline the measures it intends to implement to attain its MTO. If the EU Member State does not comply with both the deficit limit and the debt limit, a so-called "Excessive Deficit Procedure" (EDP) is initiated along with a deadline to comply, which basically includes and outlines an "adjustment path towards reaching the MTO". This procedure is outlined by the "dissuasive arm" regulation.

The SGP was initially proposed by German finance minister Theo Waigel in the mid-1990s. Germany had long maintained a low-inflation policy, which had been an important part of the German economy's strong performance since the 1950s. The German government hoped to ensure the continuation of that policy through the SGP, which would ensure the prevalence of fiscal responsibility, and limit the ability of governments to exert inflationary pressures on the European economy. As such, it was also described to be a key tool for the Member States adopting the euro, to ensure that they did not only meet the Maastricht convergence criteria at the time of adopting the euro, but kept on to comply with the fiscal criteria for the following years.

Criticism
The Pact has been criticised by some as being insufficiently flexible and needing to be applied over the economic cycle rather than in any one year. The problem is, that countries in the EMU cannot react to economic shocks with a change of their monetary policy since it is coordinated by the ECB and not by national central banks. Consequently, countries have to use fiscal policy i.e. government spending to absorb the shock. They fear that by limiting governments' abilities to spend during economic slumps may intensify recessions and hamper growth. In contrast, other critics think that the Pact is too flexible; economist Antonio Martino writes: "The fiscal constraints introduced with the new currency must be criticized not because they are undesirable—in my view they are a necessary component of a liberal order—but because they are ineffective. This is amply evidenced by the "creative accounting" gimmickry used by many countries to achieve the required deficit to GDP ratio of 3 percent, and by the immediate abandonment of fiscal prudence by some countries as soon as they were included in the euro club. Also, the Stability Pact has been watered down at the request of Germany and France."

Some remark that it has been applied inconsistently: the Council failed to apply sanctions against France and Germany, while punitive proceedings were started (but fines never applied) when dealing with Portugal (2002) and Greece (2005). In 2002 the European Commission President (1999–2004) Romano Prodi described it as "stupid", but was still required by the Treaty to seek to apply its provisions.

The Pact has proved to be unenforceable against big countries such as France and Germany, which were its strongest promoters when it was created. These countries have run "excessive" deficits under the Pact definition for some years. The reasons that larger countries have not been punished include their influence and large number of votes on the Council, which must approve sanctions; their greater resistance to "naming and shaming" tactics, since their electorates tend to be less concerned by their perceptions in the European Union; their weaker commitment to the euro compared to smaller states; and the greater role of government spending in their larger and more enclosed economies. The Pact was further weakened in 2005 to waive France's and Germany's violations.

Timeline 
This is a timeline of how the Stability and Growth Act evolved over time:

 1997: The Stability and Growth Act is decided.
 1998: The preventative arm comes into force.
 1999: The corrective arm comes into force.
 2005: The SGP is amended. 
 2011: The Six Pack enters into force.
 2013: The Fiscal Compact and the Two-Pack are adopted.
 2020: The General Escape Clause is adopted and the SGP fiscal rules are suspended.

Reform 2005
In March 2005, the EU Council, under the pressure of France and Germany, relaxed the rules; the EC said it was to respond to criticisms of insufficient flexibility and to make the pact more enforceable.

The Ecofin agreed on a reform of the SGP. The ceilings of 3% for budget deficit and 60% for public debt were maintained, but the decision to declare a country in excessive deficit can now rely on certain parameters: the behaviour of the cyclically adjusted budget, the level of debt, the duration of the slow growth period and the possibility that the deficit is related to productivity-enhancing procedures.

The pact is part of a set of Council Regulations, decided upon the European Council Summit 22–23 March 2005.

 Reform changes of the preventive arm
 Country-specific Medium-Term budgetary Objectives (MTO)'s: Previously throughout 1999-2004 the SGP had outlined a common MTO for all Member States, which was "to achieve a budgetary position of close to balance or in surplus over a complete business cycle". After the reform, MTOs were calculated to country-specific values according to "the economic and budgetary position and sustainability risks of the Member State", based upon the state's current debt-to-GDP ratio and long-term potential GDP growth, while the overall objective over the medium term is still "to achieve a budgetary position of close to balance or in surplus over a complete business cycle". No exact formula for the calculation of the country specific MTO was presented in 2005, but it was emphasized the upper limit for the MTO should be at a level "providing a safety margin towards continuously respecting the government's 3% deficit limit, while ensuring fiscal sustainability in the long run". In addition it was enforced by the EU regulation, that the upper MTO limit for eurozone states or ERM II Member States should be: Max. 1.0% of GDP in structural deficit if the state had a combination of low debt and high potential growth, and if the opposite was the case – or if the state suffered from increased age-related sustainability risks in the long term, then the upper MTO limit should move up to be in "balance or in surplus". Finally it was emphasized, that each Member State has the task to select its MTO when submitting its yearly convergence/stability programme report, and always allowed to select its MTO at a more ambitious level compared to the upper MTO limit, if this better suited its medium-term fiscal policy.
 Minimum annual budgetary effort – for states on the adjustment path to reach its MTO: All Member States agreed, that fiscal consolidation of the budget should be pursued "when the economic conditions are favourable", which was defined as being periods where the actual GDP growth exceeded the average for long-term potential growth. In regards of windfall revenues, a rule was also agreed, that such funds should be spent directly on reduction of government deficit and debt. In addition a special adjustment rule was agreed for all Eurozone states and ERM-II member states being found not yet to have reached their MTO, outlining that they commit to implement yearly improvements for its structural deficit equal to minimum 0.5% of GDP.
 Early-warning system: The existing early-warning mechanism is expanded. The European Commission can now also issue an "opinion" directed to member states, without a prior Council involvement, in situations where the opinion functions as formal advice and encouragement to a Member State for realizing the agreed adjustment path towards reaching its declared MTO. This means that the commission will not limit its opinion/recommendations only to situations with an acute risk of breaching the 3% of GDP reference value, but also contact Member States with a notification letter in cases where it finds unjustified deviations from the adjustment path towards the declared MTO or unexpected breaches of the MTO itself (even if the 3% deficit limit is fully respected).
 Structural reforms: To ensure that implementation of needed structural reforms will not face disincentives due to the regime of complying with the adjustment path towards reaching a declared MTO, it was agreed that implementation of major structural reforms (if they have direct long-term cost-saving effects – and can be verified to improve fiscal sustainability over the long term – i.e. pension scheme reforms), should automatically allow for a temporary deviation from the MTO or its adjustment path, equal to the costs of implementing the structural reform, in the condition that the 3% deficit limit will be respected and the MTO or MTO-adjustment path will be reached again within the four-year programme period.

 Reform changes of the correcting arm
 Definition of excessive deficits:
 Deadlines and repetition of steps in the excessive deficit procedure:
 Taking into account systemic pension reforms:
 Focus on debt and fiscal sustainability:

 Reform changes of the economic governance
 Fiscal governance:
 Statistical governance:

Reform 2011 and hints to the new European economic governance

The 2010 European sovereign debt crisis proved the serious shortcomings embedded in the SGP. On one hand, fiscal wisdom was not spontaneously followed by the majority of Eurozone Members during the early-2000s expansion cycle. On the other, the EDP was not duly carried out when necessary, as the cases of France and Germany clearly show.

In order to stabilise the Eurozone, Member States adopted an extensive package of reforms, aiming at straightening both the substantive budgetary rules and the enforcement framework. The result was a complete revision of the SGP. The measures adopted soon proved highly controversial, because they implied an unprecedented curtailment of national sovereignty and the conferral upon the Union of penetrating surveillance competences.

The new framework consists of a patchwork of normative acts, both within and outside the formal EU edifice. As a consequence, the system is now much more complex.

Treaty on Stability, Governance and Coordination 
The Treaty on Stability, Coordination and Governance (TSCG) was signed on 2 March 2012 by all euro area Members and eight other EU Member States and entered into force on 1 January 2013. The TSCG – commonly labeled as "Fiscal Compact" – was intended to promote the launch of a new intergovernmental economic cooperation outside the formal framework of the EU treaties.

The agreement contains the fundamental obligation for signatories to introduce a general duty of balanced budget directly in national constitutions. The most striking feature is the establishment of an automatic correction mechanism: the debt stock must be reduced of one twentieth per annum in case it exceeds the reference value of 60%. In order to make compliance swiftly verifiable, independent bodies must be established at national level for the monitoring of statistical data.

Secondary legislation 
A number of secondary legislative acts were implemented in order to strengthen both the preventive and the corrective arms of the SGP. One must distinguish between the 2011 Six-Pack and the 2013 Two-Pack.

Six-Pack 
The Six-Pack consists of five Regulations and one Directive introduced in 2011.

 Regulation 1177/2011 modified the Excessive Deficit Procedure. On one side, each procedural step was subjected to a precise and bounding timing. On the other, the flexibility clauses listed in Art. 126(3) were better specified in order to reduce enforcement uncertainty;
 Regulation 1176/2011 introduced the Macroeconomic Imbalance Procedure (MIP), a new procedure originally not foreseen by the treaties. This procedure is not concerned with budgetary rules, but with the reduction of "macroeconomic imbalances". The latter consist in economic trends experienced by one State which are capable of upsetting the normal functioning of the economy. An example of such trends might be the development of a housing bubble like the one experienced in Ireland in 2010 or of an uncontrolled commercial surplus or deficit;
 Regulations 1173/2011 and 1174/2012 modified the framework for the imposition of sanctions in the context of both the EDP and the MIP. A semiautomatic mechanism was introduced: the establishment of a budgetary infringement would trigger a fining decision within the Council unless a qualified majority vote expresses a contrary opinion. Furthermore, as the infringements persists, less afflictive sanctions (such as interest-bearing deposits) are automatically transformed in more afflictive ones (either non-interest-bearing deposits or fines).
 Regulation 1175/2011 introduced the so-called European Semester. This is a procedure meant to provide a forum for ex ante coordination of economic and budgetary policies of Member States on an annual basis. In particular, every year in April Euro area Member States submit their "stability programmes", while Member outside the euro area submit "convergence programmes". These documents outline the main elements of the Member States' budgetary plans and are assessed by the commission. An important part of the assessment addresses compliance with the minimum annual benchmark figures set for each individual country's structural budget balance. Based on its assessment of the stability and convergence programmes, the Commission draws up country-specific recommendations on which the Council adopts opinions in July. These include recommendations for appropriate policy actions. Furthermore, the Council adopts recommendations on economic policies that apply to the euro area as a whole.

Arguably, this first reform package successfully strengthened both the preventive (see the last Regulation) and the corrective arm (see the first three Regulations) of the SGP.

Two-Pack 
The Two-Pack consists of two Regulations adopted in 2013. They are exclusively applicable to Eurozone Members and aim at strengthening budgetary compliance therein. They were deemed necessary given the higher potential for spillover effects of budgetary policies in a common currency area.

The scope of the two instruments is slightly different. The first one is concerned with States which "experience, or are threatened by, financial instability such as to lead to potential spillover effects". These States are made subject to more stringent surveillance, in order to prevent possible sovereign debt crises. The second one is directed to all Eurozone Members and is concerned with macroeconomic coordination. In particular, a more stringent timing is introduced for the submission of budgetary programs of Euro area Members on annual basis.

Assessment and criticism 
In the post-crisis period, the legal debate on EMU largely focused on assessing the effects of both the Six- and the Two-Pack on the SGP. Most scholars admit that a considerable improvement occurred in the field of budgetary enforcement, especially for what concerns the imposition of dissuasive sanctions upon noncompliant Members. However, critical positions generally outnumber positive ones.

Many have criticised the growing complexity of the enforcement procedures. The reform process had to reconcile a strong tightening of the EDP with the pressure for wider escape clauses. The tension between these opposite trends fostered the developments of complicated assessment criteria, often translated in sophisticated mathematical formulas. This not only induces confusion in the overall framework, but also makes the procedural outcome hardly predictable for Member States.

Another widespread criticism concerns the high democratic deficit embedded by the SGP. National policymakers are elected democratically backed up at national level, whereas the EU (in its quality of central watchdog) is only in an indirect way. The friction between the two levels is ever more perceived in periods of economic distress, when the quest for budgetary consolidation becomes more compelling. Scholars agree in referring the issue of democratic deficit to the lack of a more federalised institutional framework for the Eurozone economic governance. The argument goes that strongly legitimated Union institutions would avoid the need for penetrating surveillance mechanisms, as they would partially shift economic policymaking at central level.

Bailout programs 
As a consequence of the crisis, some Members lost access to financial markets to refinance their debt. Clearly, the SGP framework proved not enough to ensure the stability of the Eurozone. For this reason, a bailout facility was deemed necessary to face such extraordinary challenges. The first attempt was the European Financial Stability Facility (EFSF), specifically created in 2010 to help Greece, Portugal and Ireland. However, a permanent facility was created two years later with the establishment of the European Stability Mechanism (ESM). The latter consists of an international treaty signed on 2 February 2012 by Eurozone Members only.

Ailing Members receive financial aid in the form of low-interest loans whose disbursement is attached policy conditionalities. The latter usually consist in Macroeconomic Adjustment Programs (MAPs) whose adoption is deemed necessary to fix the imbalances which gave raise to the original instability.

Bailout programs do not constitute enforcement procedure stricto sensu. However, since financial support always entails compliance with a number of budgetary and economic conditionalities, they can be construed a sort of ex post enforcement mechanism.

Member states by SGP criteria 

The deficit and debt criterion is applied to both Eurozone and non-Eurozone EU member states. Data in the table are for the fiscal year 2017, published on Eurostat website.

Medium-Term budgetary Objective (MTO)

1999–2005
Across the first seven years, since the entry into force of the Stability and Growth Pact, all EU Member States were required to strive towards a common MTO being "to achieve a budgetary position of close to balance or in surplus over a complete business cycle – while providing a safety margin towards continuously respecting the government's 3% deficit limit". The first part of this MTO, was interpreted by the Commission Staff Service to mean continuously achievement each year throughout the business cycle of a "cyclically-adjusted budget balance net of one-off and temporary measures" (also referred to as the "structural balance") at minimum 0.0%. In 2000, the second part was interpreted and operationalized into a calculation formula for the MTO also to respect the so-called "Minimal Benchmark" (later referred to as "MTO Minimum Benchmark"). When assessing the annual Convergence/Stability programmes of the Member States, the Commission Staff Service checked whether the structural balance of the state complied with both the common "close to balance or surplus" criteria and the country-specific "Minimal Benchmark" criteria. The last round under this assessment scheme took place in Spring 2005, while all subsequent assessments were conducted according to a new reformed scheme – introducing the concept of a single country-specific MTO as the overall steering anchor for the fiscal policy.

After the 2005–reform
In order to ensure long-term compliance with the SGP deficit and debt criteria, the member states have since the SGP-reform in March 2005 striven towards achieving their country-specific Medium-Term budgetary Objective (MTO). The MTO is the set limit, that the structural balance relative to GDP needs to equal or be above for each year in the medium-term. Each state select its own MTO, but it needs to equal or be better than a calculated minimum requirement (Minimum MTO) ensuring sustainability of the government accounts throughout the long-term (calculated on basis of both future potential GDP growth, future cost of government debt, and future increases in age-related costs). The structural balance is calculated by the European Commission as the cyclically adjusted balance minus "one-off measures" (i.e. one-off payments due to reforming a pension scheme). The cyclically adjusted balance is calculated by adjusting the achieved general government balance (in % of GDP) compared to each year's relative economic growth position in the business cycle (referred to as the "output gap"), which is found by subtraction of the achieved GDP growth with the potential GDP growth. So if a year is recorded with average GDP growth in the business cycle (equal to the potential GDP growth rate), the output gap will then be zero, meaning that the "cyclically-adjusted balance" then will be equal to the "government budget balance". In this way, because it is resistant to GDP growth changes, the structural balance is considered to be neutral and comparable across an entire business cycle (including both recession years and "overheated years"), making it perfect to be used consistently as a medium-term budgetary objective.

Whenever a country does not reach its MTO, it is required in the subsequent year(s) to implement annual improvements for its structural balance equal to minimum 0.5% of GDP, although several sub-rules (including the "expenditure benchmark") has the potential slightly to alter this requirement. When Member States are in this process of improving their structural balance until it reaches its MTO, they are referred to as being on the "adjustment path", and they shall annually report an updated target year for when they expect to reach their MTO. It is the responsibility of each Member State through a note in their annual Convergence/Stability report, to select their contemporary MTO at a point being equal to or above the "minimum MTO" calculated every third year by the European Commission (most recently in October 2012). The "minimum MTO" that the "nationally selected MTO" needs to respect, is equal to the strictest of the following three limits (which since a method change in 2012 now automatically is rounded to the lowest -value, if calculated to a figure with the last two digits after punctuation differing from 00/25/50/75, i.e. -0.51% will be rounded to -0.75%):

(1) MTOMB (the Minimum Benchmark, adds a public budget safety margin to ensure the 3%-limit will be respected during economic downturns)

(2) MTOILD (the minimum value ensuring long-term sustainability of public budgets taking into account the Implicit Liabilities and Debt, aiming to ensure convergence across a long-term horizon of debt ratios towards prudent levels below 60% with due consideration to the forecast budgetary impact of ageing populations)

(3) MTOea/erm2/fc (the SGP regulation explicitly defined a -1.0% limit applying for eurozone states or ERM2 members already in 2005, but if having committed to a stricter requirement through ratification of the Fiscal Compact – then this stricter limit will replace it).

The third minimum limit listed above (MTOea/erm2/fc), mean that EU member states having ratified the Fiscal Compact and being bound by its fiscal provisions, are obliged to select a MTO which does not exceed a structural deficit of 1.0% of GDP at maximum if they have a debt-to-GDP ratio significantly below 60%, and of 0.5% of GDP maximum if they have a debt-to-GDP ratio above 60%. As of January 2015, the following six states are not bound by the fiscal provisions of the Fiscal Compact (note that for non-Eurozone states to be bound by the fiscal provisions, it is not enough just to ratify the Fiscal Compact, they also need to attach a declaration of intent to be bound by the fiscal provisions, before this is the case): UK, Czech Republic, Croatia, Poland, Sweden, Hungary. Those of the non-eurozone states neither being ERM-2 members nor having committed to respect the fiscal provisions of the Fiscal Compact, will still be required to set a national MTO respecting the calculated "minimum MTO" being equal to the strictest of requirement (1)+(2). The only EU member state being exempted to comply with this MTO procedure is the UK, as it per a protocol to the EU treaty is exempted from complying with the SGP. In other words, while all other member states are obliged nationally to select at MTO respecting their calculated Minimum MTO, the calculated Minimum MTO for the UK is only presented for advice, with no obligation for it to set a compliant national MTO in structural terms.

The Minimum MTOs are recalculated every third year by the Alternates of the Economic and Financial Committee, based on the above described procedure and formulas, that among others require the prior publication of the commission's triennial Ageing Report. A Member State can also have its Minimum MTO updated outside the ordinary schedule, if it implement structural reforms with a major impact on the long-term sustainability of the public finances (i.e. a major pension reform) – and subsequently submit a formal request for an extraordinary recalculation. The collapsed table below, display the input data and calculated Minimum MTOs from the three latest ordinary recalculations (April 2009, October 2012 and September 2015).

Nationally selected MTOs
Whenever a "Minimum MTO" gets recalculated for a country, the announcement of a "nationally selected MTO" that is equal to or above this recalculated "Minimum MTO" shall occur as part of the following ordinary stability/convergence report, while only taking effect compliance-wise for the fiscal account(s) in the years after the new "nationally selected MTO" has been announced. The tables below have listed all country-specific MTOs selected by national governments throughout 2005–2015, and colored each year red/green to display whether or not the "nationally selected MTO" was achieved, according to the latest revision of the structural balance data as calculated by the "European Commission method". Some states, i.e. Denmark and Latvia, apply a national method to calculate the structural balance figures reported in their convergence report (which greatly differs from the results of the commission's method), but for the sake of presenting comparable results for all Member States, the "MTO achieved" coloring of the tables (and if not met also the noted forecast year of reaching it) is decided solely by the results of the commission's calculation method.

Note A: Setting country-specific MTOs only became mandatory starting from the 2006 fiscal year. However, Denmark and Sweden by own initiative already did so for 2005. For states without a country-specific MTO in 2005, the green/red compliance color in this specific year indicate, if the structural balance of the state complied with both the common "close to balance or surplus" (min. 0.0%) target and the country-specific "minimum benchmark". The latter only being stricter for two states in 2005, effectively setting a +0.8% target for Finland, +0.1% target for Luxembourg, and a 0.0% target for the rest of the states to respect.

Note B: Due to Eurostat implementing a significant method change for the calculation of budget balances (classifying "funded defined-contribution pension schemes" outside of the government's budget balance), which technically reduced revenues and budget balance data by 1% of GDP for states with such schemes, the earliest MTOs presented by Sweden and Denmark were technically adjusted to be 1% lower, in order to be comparable with the structural balance data calculated by the latest Eurostat method. When MTO-target compliance is checked for in 2005–07, by looking at the structural balance data calculated by the latest Eurostat method, this compliance check is conducted of the "technically-adjusted MTO-targets" rather than the "originally reported MTO-targets" for Denmark and Sweden.

Note about UK: Paragraph 4 of Treaty Protocol No 15, exempts UK from the obligation in Article 126(1+9+11) of the Treaty on the Functioning of the European Union to avoid excessive general government deficits, for as long as the state opts not to adopt the euro. Paragraph 5 of the same protocol however still provides that the "UK shall endeavour to avoid an excessive government deficit". On one hand, this means that the Commission and Council still approach the UK with EDP recommendations whenever excessive deficits are found, but on the other hand, they legally can not launch any sanctions against the UK if they do not comply with the recommendations. Due to its special exemption, the UK also did not incorporate the additional MTO adjustment rules introduced by the 2005 SGP reform and six-pack reform. Instead, the UK defined their own budget concept comprising a "Golden rule" and "Sustainable investment rule", effectively running throughout 1998–2008, which was UK's national interpretation how the SGP-regulation text should be understood.
 The so-called Golden rule would only be met, if the Current Budget (the "nominal budget balance of the general government" before expenses used for "public net investment") expressed as a ratio to GDP, is calculated in average to be in balance or surplus (equal to minimum 0.0%) over the period starting in the first year of the economic cycle and ending with the last year of the economic cycle. In this way, it could not definitively be determined whether or not the Golden rule had been met, before an entire economic cycle had been completed. Along the way, there were no year-specific target set for the Cyclically-Adjusted Current Budget (CACB) balance, which was allowed to fluctuate throughout the cycle – although only to the extent of ensuring the Golden rule would be met at the latest by the end of the cycle. For comparison towards the commission's structural balance calculation scheme, the UK's CACB balance was found in average to be 1–2% higher than the structural budget balance figure for all medium-term periods reported since 1998, simply because the CACB is equal to: "Structural budget balance" + "Public sector net investment" (between 1-2% when averaged over five years) + "reversed adjustment for one-off revenues/expenditures" (close to 0% when averaged over five years).
 The so-called sustainable investment rule (also applying for 1998–2008), demanded that "Public sector net debt as a proportion of GDP" should be held over the economic cycle at a stable level beneath a 40%-limit. With this target being set in "net debt", it differed from the SGP's 60%-target which was related to "gross debt".
 When it was evident the UK business cycle stretching from 1997 to 2006 had ended, the UK government found that both its "Golden rule" and "Sustainable Investment rule" had been attained across this specific cycle. Starting from 2008 to 2009 and forward throughout the current business cycle, the two previous rules were replaced by a "temporary operating rule", because of the current cycle being forecast not to be normal (featuring a prolonged recovery phase compared to a normal cycle). The "temporary operating rule" now target: "to allow for a sharp CACB deterioration in the short-term (by applying active loosening fiscal policy in addition to the automatic stabilizers throughout 2008-09 and 2009-10), and then once the economy has emerged from the downturn, to set policies to improve the CACB each year going forward, so that it reaches balance and net debt start to decline in the medium-term".
 As no MTO was nationally selected by the UK in "structural balance terms" – throughout the entire period covered by the table, the compliance colors for the UK indicate whether or not its structural balance each year respected its "Minimum MTO" as calculated in structural balance terms by the commission.

Note about UK: Paragraph 4 of Treaty Protocol No 15, exempts UK from the obligation in Article 126(1+9+11) of the Treaty on the Functioning of the European Union to avoid excessive general government deficits, for as long as the state opts not to adopt the euro. Paragraph 5 of the same protocol however still provides that the "UK shall endeavour to avoid an excessive government deficit". On one hand, this means that the Commission and Council still approach the UK with EDP recommendations whenever excessive deficits are found, but on the other hand, they legally can not launch any sanctions against the UK if they do not comply with the recommendations. Due to its special exemption, the UK also did not incorporate the additional MTO adjustment rules introduced by the 2005 SGP reform and six-pack reform. Instead, the UK defined their own budget concept, which was operated by a "Golden rule" and "Sustainable investment rule" throughout 1998-2008 (described in detail by the table note further above), and since then by a "temporary operating rule".
 The so-called temporary operating rule commit the government "to allow for a sharp Cyclically-Adjusted Current Budget (CACB) deterioration in the short-term during a severe economic crisis (throughout 2008-09 and 2009-10), by applying active loosening fiscal policy in addition to the automatic stabilizers, and then once the economy has emerged from the downturn, to set policies to improve the CACB each year going forward, so that it reaches balance and net debt start to decline in the medium-term". In other words, the CACB is targeted only to reach minimum 0.0% in the medium term, after having been allowed temporarily to deteriorate throughout the 2008–09 and 2009-10 fiscal years. The CACB figures correspond to the commission's reported structural budget balance figures, except that it does not include the expenditure "Public sector net investment" and refrains from performing any adjustment for one-off revenues/expenditures. For comparison with the SGP's definition of structural budget balance, it shall be noted that the UK has been forecasted to spend on average 1.5% of GDP annually on "Public sector net investment" throughout the seven years from 2013–14 to 2019–20. When this extra expense is subtracted from the CACB balance, it will be equal to the commission's "structural budget balance before adjustment for one-off revenues/expenditures". As of 2015, the CACB surplus target and CACB definition has remained unchanged, but its achievement date has now been postponed from its initial set 2015-16 fiscal year to the 2017-18 fiscal year.
 The UK fiscal debt-ratio target under the "temporary operating rule", also differs from the SGP debt-ratio target, as it measure compliance with the target according to "net debt" rather than "gross debt", and only require a declining trend to start from 2015 to 2016, a target which was slightly postponed in 2015, so that it shall now only decline starting from 2016 to 2017.
 As no MTO was nationally selected by the UK in "structural balance terms" – throughout the entire period covered by the table, the compliance colors for the UK indicate whether or not its structural balance each year respected its "Minimum MTO" as calculated in structural balance terms by the commission.

See also 
 Convergence criteria for joining the Eurozone
 Fiscal union
 Euro Plus Pact
 Sixpack (EU)
 List of acronyms associated with the eurozone crisis

Bibliography 
 Matthias Belafi und Roman Maruhn (2005): C·A·P-Position: Ein neuer Stabilitätspakt? Bilanz des Gipfelkompromisses, Centrum für angewandte Politikforschung 
 Anne Brunila, Marco Buti & Daniele Franco,: The Stability and Growth Pact, Palgrave, 2001
 Peter Bofinger (2003): »The Stability and Growth Pact neglects the policy mix between fiscal and monetary policy«, in: Intereconomics, Review of European Economic Policy, 1, S. 4–7.
 Daniel Gros (2005): Reforming the Stability Pact, S. 14–17, in: Boonstra, Eijffinger, Gros, Hefeker (2005), Forum: The Stability and Growth Pact in Need of Reform, in: Intereconomics, 40. Jg., Nr. 1, S. 4–21.
 Friedrich Heinemann (2004): Die strategische Klugheit der Dummheit – keine Flexibilisierung des Stabilitätspaktes ohne Entpolitisierung, S. 62–71, in: Hefeker, Heinemann, Zimmermann (2004), Wirtschaftspolitisches Forum: Braucht die EU einen flexibleren Stabilitätspakt?, in: Zeitschrift für Wirtschaftspolitik, 53. Jahrgang, Heft 1, S. 53–80. 
 Kai Hentschelmann (2010): Der Stabilitäts- und Wachstumspakt als Ordnungsrahmen in Krisenzeiten, Europa-Kolleg Hamburg, Institute for European Integration, Discussion Paper Nr. 1/10.

References

External links
 Council Regulation (EC) No 1466/97 of 7 July 1997 on the strengthening of the surveillance of budgetary positions and the surveillance and coordination of economic policies
 Council Regulation (EC) No 1467/97 of 7 July 1997 on speeding up and clarifying the implementation of the excessive deficit procedure
 European Commission, Directorate General for Economic and Financial Affairs. Stability and Growth Pact
 Federal Statistical Office Germany page on General government consolidated gross debt as a percentage of GDP
 Federal Statistical Office Germany page on Share of net borrowing or net lending of general government in the gross domestic product
 Björn Hacker/Till van Treeck: What influence for European governance? The reformed stability and growth pact, the Europe 2020 strategy and the "European Semester", Friedrich-Ebert-Stiftung, December 2010 (PDF 115 KB)

European Union economic policy
Fiscal policy
1997 in economics
1997 in the European Union